Leprechaun 4: In Space is a 1997 American science fiction black comedy slasher film directed by Brian Trenchard-Smith and written by Dennis Pratt. Warwick Davis stars as the titular leprechaun, who terrorizes a Marine crew aboard a spaceship in order to retrieve a princess he intends to wed.

The film is the fourth installment in the Leprechaun series, preceded by Leprechaun 3 (1995) and followed by Leprechaun in the Hood (2000). It received largely negative reviews.

Plot
In 2096, on a remote planet, the Leprechaun courts an alien princess named Zarina, in a nefarious plot to become king of her home planet. The two agree to marry, with each partner secretly planning to kill the other after the wedding night in order to enjoy the marriage benefits (a peerage for the Leprechaun, the Leprechaun's gold and jewels for the princess) undisturbed.

A platoon of space marines arrive on the planet and kill the Leprechaun for interfering with mining operations. Lucky tries to steal gold but gets killed by the leprechaun's lightsaber. A grenade explodes and kills the leprechaun. Gloating over the victory, one of the marines, Kowalski, urinates on the Leprechaun's body. Unbeknownst to Kowalski, the Leprechaun's spirit travels up his urine stream and into his penis, where his presence manifests as gonorrhea. The marines return to their ship with the injured Zarina, whom they plan to return to her homeworld in order to establish positive diplomatic relations. The ship's commander, the cyborg Dr. Mittenhand, explains his plans to use Zarina's regenerative DNA to recreate his own body, which was mutilated in a failed experiment. Elsewhere on the ship, the Leprechaun violently emerges from Kowalski's penis after he is aroused during a sexual act. The marines hunt the Leprechaun, who outsmarts them and kills most of the crew in gruesome and absurd ways.

While pursuing Zarina, the Leprechaun injects Mittenhand with a mixture of Zarina's DNA and the remains of a blended scorpion and tarantula, before initiating the ship's self-destruct mechanism. A surviving marine, Sticks, rushes to the bridge to defuse the self-destruct but is stopped by a password prompt. Mittenhand—now a grotesque monster calling himself "Mittenspider"—entangles Sticks in a giant web. Meanwhile, the other survivors confront the Leprechaun in the cargo bay, where they inadvertently cause him to transform into a giant after shooting him with Dr. Mittenhand's experimental growth ray.

The ship's biological officer, Tina Reeves, escapes to the bridge and rescues Sticks by spraying Mittenhand with liquid nitrogen and shooting him. The only other surviving marine, Books, opens the airlock so the giant Leprechaun is sucked into space and explodes. Books joins the others at the helm and they deduce that the password is "Wizard", since Dr. Mittenhand previously compared himself to the Wizard of Oz. After stopping the self-destruct sequence, Books and Reeves kiss, while Sticks looks out the window to see the Leprechaun's giant hand giving him the finger.

Cast
 Warwick Davis as Lubdan The Leprechaun 
 Rebekah Carlton as Princess Zarina
 Brent Jasmer as Staff Sergeant "Books" Malloy
 Jessica Collins as Dr. Tina Reeves
 Guy Siner as Dr. Mittenhand / The Mittenspider
 Gary Grossman as Harold
 Tim Colceri as Master Sergeant "Metal Head" Hooker
 Miguel A. Nunez Jr. as Private "Sticks"
 Debbe Dunning as Private Delores Costello
 Mike Cannizzo as Private Danny O'Grady
 Rick Peters as Private "Mooch"
 Geoff Meed as Private Kowalski
 Ladd York as Private "Lucky"

Critical reception 

This film holds a 17% approval rating on review aggregator website Rotten Tomatoes, based on 6 reviews; the average rating is 1.5/10. The A.V. Club wrote that "the outer-space setting comes off as a desperate ploy to continue a horror series without having to pay any attention to continuity or the laws of reality". DVD Talk rated the film as 3 stars of 5 stars as "Recommended".

References

External links
 
 
 

1997 films
1997 horror films
1997 direct-to-video films
1990s science fiction films
American science fiction horror films
American space adventure films
American sequel films
American slasher films
1990s English-language films
Direct-to-video horror films
Direct-to-video sequel films
Films about size change
Films directed by Brian Trenchard-Smith
Films set in the 2090s
Films set on fictional planets
Films set on spacecraft
Trimark Pictures films
Leprechaun (film series)
Films set in the future
Films about princesses
1990s American films